Physalaemus atlanticus is a species of frog in the family Leptodactylidae.
It is endemic to Brazil.
Its natural habitats are subtropical or tropical moist lowland forests, freshwater marshes, and intermittent freshwater marshes.

References

atlanticus
Endemic fauna of Brazil
Taxonomy articles created by Polbot
Amphibians described in 2004